The Irish Council of Churches (ICC) (founded 1922, reorganised under its present name 1966) is an ecumenical Christian body. It is a sister organisation of Churches Together in Britain and Ireland.  

Member churches are currently:
 The Antiochian Orthodox Church,
 The Church of Ireland,
 The Greek Orthodox Church in Britain and Ireland,
 The LifeLink Network of Churches,
 The Lutheran Church in Ireland,
 The Methodist Church in Ireland,
 The Moravian Church (Irish District),
 The Non-subscribing Presbyterian Church of Ireland,
 The Presbyterian Church in Ireland,
 Quakers in Ireland,
 The Rock of Ages Cherubim and Seraphim Church, (Eternal Sacred Order of Cherubim and Seraphim)
 The Romanian Orthodox Church in Ireland,
 The Russian Orthodox Church in Ireland,
 The Salvation Army (Ireland Division),
 The Syriac Orthodox Church.

The Irish Inter-Church Meeting (IICM) was established in 1973 as a forum between ICC's member churches and the Catholic Church.

References

Christianity in Ireland
Christianity in Northern Ireland
All-Ireland organisations
Christian organizations established in 1922
1922 establishments in Ireland
1922 establishments in Northern Ireland